A centenarium is a type of Ancient Roman fortified farmhouse in the Limes Tripolitanus. It is called even in the plural centenaria, because in the Limes Tripolitanus there were more than 2000 of these "fortifications", connected to create a defensive system against desert tribe raids.

History
The first centenaria were built during the reign of Trajan and during Septimius Severus expansions of Roman Libya and Africa Proconsularis, when the Limes Tripolitanus was established.

From around the time of disbandment of the Legio III Augusta in 238 AD, legionaries built around two thousand centenaria in the areas around Leptis Magna and Sabratha. Examples remain at Gherait esh-Shergia and Gasr Banat. Some were characterized by the presence of paleochristian churches.

Indeed, Leptis Magna, the main city in Roman Tripolitania, prospered mainly because Rome stopped bandits from plundering the countryside. But even because the Roman Empire – mainly under Trajan and Septimius Severus – curbed unrest among local tribal groups with the creation of the Limes Tripolitanus and with the creation and development of cities (like Gaerisa) and forts (like Garbia) with Centenaria farms around the southern periphery of Leptis area. The centenaria system of production, based on autochthonous Berbers who were partially Latinized and often even Christians, was successful and worked very well until Byzantine times.

Centenaria remained in use for several centuries after the Arab conquest of North Africa in the second half of the seventh century, until the system collapsed in the eleventh century CE. Some have been turned into lavish villas, such as Suq al-Awty.

There is much conjecture about the origin of the word centenarium and whether it is etymologically tied to the locally built fortified farmhouses called Gasr (plural Gsur). Probably their Latin name was due to the fact that one hundred men (one hundred is said in Latin centum) worked each fortified farm, under the orders of a former centurion.

References

Bibliography
 Di Vita, Antonino. Quaderni di archeologia della Libia. Volume 5  Ed. L'ERMA di Bretschneider. Roma, 1967  

Africa (Roman province)
History of Tripolitania
Latin words and phrases